Howard Harvard Kendler (June 9, 1919 — February 17, 2011) was an American psychologist who conducted research on latent and discrimination learning. He also published influential analyses of the theoretical and methodological foundations of modern psychology.

Early life and education
Kendler was born on June 9, 1919, in New York City, New York. He studied psychology at Brooklyn College, where he worked as an assistant to Abraham Maslow and conducted a project on thinking under the supervision of Solomon Asch. During this time, Kendler became interested in Gestalt psychology, which prompted him to enroll at the University of Iowa in the hopes of working with Kurt Lewin. However, Kendler later changed his mind and chose to work with Kenneth Spence, under whose supervision Kendler received his Ph.D. from the University of Iowa in 1943.

Academic career
After serving in the United States Army during World War II, Kendler joined the faculty of the University of Colorado as an assistant professor after the University successfully persuaded the Army to discharge him. In 1948, he joined the faculty of New York University, where he became Professor of Psychology and Chair of the Department of Psychology at University College in 1951. In 1963, he joined the faculty of the University of California, Santa Barbara (UCSB). He was a fellow of the Center for Advanced Study in the Behavioral Sciences in 1969 and 1970, and served as president of the Western Psychological Association in 1971. He retired from the faculty of UCSB in 1990.

Personal life and death
Kendler was married to Tracy Kendler (born Tracy Sylvia Seedman), who was also an academic psychologist. In addition to their marriage, the two collaborated on some of their research on discrimination learning. They had two sons: Kenneth and Joel. Howard and Tracy Kendler named their second son Kenneth after Kenneth Spence, the Ph.D. supervisor whom they had both shared. Howard Kendler died on February 17, 2011, in Santa Barbara, California.

References

1919 births
2011 deaths
20th-century American psychologists
Brooklyn College alumni
University of Iowa alumni
United States Army personnel of World War II
University of Colorado faculty
New York University faculty
Center for Advanced Study in the Behavioral Sciences fellows
University of California, Santa Barbara faculty
Gestalt psychologists